Peter Patrick Lorimer (14 December 1946 – 20 March 2021) was a Scottish professional footballer, best known for his time with Leeds United and Scotland during the late 1960s and early 1970s. An attacking midfielder and the club's youngest-ever player, he was renowned for his powerful strikes from distance. From 1984 to 1985 he was club captain. Lorimer is the club record scorer with 238 goals in all competitions. He was voted Leeds' ninth greatest player ever and on to the greatest Leeds United team of all time.

After retiring as a player, Lorimer became a member of the Leeds board of directors, provided match commentary on BBC Radio Leeds and Yorkshire Radio and wrote a regular column in the Yorkshire Evening Post. From April 2013 he held the position of club ambassador.

Early life
Lorimer was born in Dundee to Janet and Peter Lorimer and was brought up in Broughty Ferry on the edge of the city. He attended Eastern Primary School and later Stobswell Secondary School, where he played for the school's football team.

Club career

Leeds United
After playing junior football in Dundee for Stobswell Boys and Broughty YMCA, Lorimer signed for Leeds United in May 1962 after scoring for the Scotland Schoolboys team in a 4–2 win over England. He made his Leeds debut on 29 September 1962 against Southampton, aged 15 years and 289 days, becoming the youngest player to play for the first team.

Lorimer came to regular prominence in the 1965–66 season, making 34 League Championship appearances and scoring 19 goals, more than any other player at Leeds United managed that season. A skilful and industrious player who operated best in a drifting position either wide on the right (though not as an orthodox winger – he was more likely to cut in and shoot than stay wide and cross) or behind two main strikers (usually Allan Clarke and Mick Jones), Lorimer was a frequent and often spectacular goalscorer, earning himself several nicknames stemming from his powerful shooting – HotShot and Lash being two of the more prevalent. He became renowned for these strikes, with his shots reaching speeds of up to 90 mph. One penalty kick was recorded at 107 mph.

In the 1966–67 season, Lorimer made his first major headlines when a free-kick equaliser against Chelsea in an FA Cup semi-final was controversially ruled out by referee Ken Burns and retaken, for the Chelsea players had not retreated the necessary 10 yards. Chelsea held on to win the game. In the 1975 European Cup Final, Lorimer scored to give Leeds a 1–0 lead, only for the goal to be controversially disallowed by referee Michel Kitabdjian, with Leeds going on to lose the game. In summer 1971, Lorimer had a short spell on loan at Cape Town City in South Africa. Lorimer left the club in 1979, having scored 219 goals in 616 appearances. During this time he had won two League titles, an FA Cup, a League Cup, a Charity Shield, and two Inter-Cities Fairs Cups.

Later career
He played for York City and then tried his luck in the North American Soccer League (NASL). Lorimer played for two clubs: the Toronto Blizzard (1979–1980) and the Vancouver Whitecaps (1981–83). In January 1983 he signed for University College Dublin.

Lorimer returned to Leeds United in 1983, aged 37, two seasons after Leeds had fallen into the Football League Second Division. He played under former team-mate Eddie Gray (more than a year his junior) and broke the club's goalscoring record in the process, ending up with 238 goals from 705 appearances until retiring just before his 40th birthday at the end of the 1985–86 season. However, Leeds were still a Second Division team when Lorimer played his final game for them and it would be another four years before they returned to the First Division.

International career
Lorimer made his international debut for Scotland against Austria in November 1969. He won 21 caps for Scotland and scored four goals, having played in all three of their matches at the 1974 FIFA World Cup. His Scotland career was, however, affected by a ban imposed on him in 1971 after he spent a summer playing for Cape Town City in apartheid-era South Africa.

After playing
In his retirement Lorimer ran the Commercial Inn pub in the Holbeck area of the city. Lorimer remained a dedicated spokesman for Leeds United after retirement – he was always one of the first ex-players to whom broadcasters and journalists turned when the club was in the news. He worked as a pundit at games for BBC Radio Leeds and as a columnist for the local paper, the Yorkshire Evening Post. He wrote a column in the club's match programme (his final one being the match against Aston Villa on 27 February 2021) and acted as a summariser for Yorkshire Radio on every Leeds away match.

On 26 February 2021, it was announced that Lorimer had been placed under hospice care due to a long-term illness. He died on 20 March 2021, aged 74.

Career statistics

Club

International

Scores and results list Scotland goal tally first, score column indicates score after each Scotland goal.

Honours
Leeds United
 Football League First Division: 1968–69, 1973–74
 FA Cup: 1971–72; runner-up: 1969–70, 1972–73
 Football League Cup: 1967–68
 FA Charity Shield: 1969; runner-up: 1974
 Inter-Cities Fairs Cup: 1967–68, 1970–71; runner-up: 1966–67
 European Cup runner-up: 1974–75
 European Cup Winners' Cup runner-up: 1972–73

Individual
Leeds United Player of the Year: 1971–72

References

External links

1946 births
2021 deaths
1974 FIFA World Cup players
Expatriate association footballers in the Republic of Ireland
Expatriate soccer players in Canada
Expatriate soccer players in the United States
Expatriate soccer players in South Africa
Expatriate footballers in Israel
Association football wingers
Leeds United F.C. players
North American Soccer League (1968–1984) players
Footballers from Dundee
Scotland international footballers
Scottish expatriate footballers
Scottish expatriate sportspeople in Canada
Scottish expatriate sportspeople in the United States
Scottish expatriate sportspeople in Ireland
Scottish expatriate sportspeople in South Africa
Scottish expatriate sportspeople in Israel
Scottish footballers
English Football League players
Cape Town City F.C. (NFL) players
Hapoel Haifa F.C. players
Liga Leumit players
Toronto Blizzard (1971–1984) players
University College Dublin A.F.C. players
League of Ireland players
Vancouver Whitecaps (1974–1984) players
York City F.C. players
Scotland under-23 international footballers
Scottish Football Hall of Fame inductees
Scotland amateur international footballers
Whitby Town F.C. players
National Football League (South Africa) players
FA Cup Final players